The Battle of Brémule was fought on 20 August 1119 between Henry I of England and Louis VI the Fat of France. Henry I had to defend his holdings in Normandy several times and his victory at this battle repelled a French invasion.

The French defeat at Brémule effectively crippled the barons' rebellion and led to King Louis' having to accept William Adelin as Duke of Normandy. William was officially invested with the duchy in 1120, even though King Louis continued to support William Clito's claim to the honour.

This battle is the result of a fortuitous encounter between the two neighbours who were engaged in a lawkeeping operation on their respective borders, the limits of their kingdoms being still imprecise in the Vexin and in the valley of the Seine.

Chronicles from the French side describe the battle as a fierce and bloody one where Louis the Fat, despite his heavy weight, fought so close to the opposing knights that a Norman seized his horse's reins and shouted, "The King is taken!", to which the King replied with a heavy blow from his mace, shouting back: "The King is not taken, neither at war, nor at chess!" However, this was later proven to be a misattribution.

On the other side, chronicles from the Norman side tell that their knights gained much profit from the ransoms paid by their many prisoners, and that they had only three casualties on their side.

The battle was the last pitched battle that the Capetian monarchy would participate in for the next century. Despite a century full of warfare, the next true battle for the Capetians would be the decisive Battle of Bouvines in 1214 where Philip II Augustus defeated the Holy Roman Emperor Otto IV.

References

External links
Orderic Vitalis, "Battle of Brémule, according to Orderic Vitalis", from De Re Militari: The Society for Medieval Military History, online.

1119 in Europe
1110s in France
Battles involving England
Battles involving France
Conflicts in 1119
Brémule